Yorktel is a video managed services company headquartered in Eatontown, New Jersey, that provides services for the assessment, design, integration, and management of video and audio communications. The company is involved in video interoperability, cloud products, and managed services, as well as for providing legacy video systems to large organizations.

Yorktel's government customers include the United States Department of Energy (DOE), the US Treasury, the United States Department of Agriculture (USDA), as well as other government organizations. The company's technology partners include Cisco, Polycom, Vidyo, and others.

Yorktel has offices in New Jersey, Virginia, Massachusetts, New York, Washington, D.C., the UK, France, and Ireland. It has data centers in New Jersey, the United Kingdom, and Singapore.

Ron Gaboury serves as the company's current CEO; Judi Pulig is CFO, Bin Guan is Chief Technology Officer and Joe-E Hu is Chief Information Officer.

History

Yorktel was founded in 1985 by Dr. York Wang as a company called York Telecom. Dr. Wang holds a Ph.D. in solid-state physics from the University of Missouri and a specialist certificate in quantum electronics from the University of California. Dr. Wang was recognized in 2009 as Ernst & Young’s "Entrepreneur of the Year" for entrepreneurial excellence in the category of technology.

Ron Gaboury joined Yorktel in 1995 as the chief financial officer (CFO) and later assumed the role of chief operating officer (COO). He went on to become the company's chief executive officer in 2011.

In December 2006, York Telecom acquired Univisions Crimson Group, which specialized in audio and video-systems integration. UCG, formed in 2004 when Univisions of Syracuse, N.Y., merged with Crimson Tech of Wilmington, Massachusetts, held headquarters in Syracuse and in Boston.

In April 2012, the company shortened its name to Yorktel. Also in that year, Yorktel acquired First Connections, a UK company with a presence in Ireland specializing in many of the same video conferencing capabilities. First Connections consolidated offices with Yorktel's existing Windsor, Berkshire, office in 2013. In 2014, the company acquired two more organizations; Expedite, located in the US, and MultiSense, a UK-based firm with a specialty in Telehealth. In Feb 2020, Yorktel announced the acquisition of Video Corporation of America's Business Assets  Founded in 1972, VCA has a history providing of Audio Visual, Post-Production and Broadcast, Digital Signage, and Unified Communications support services for organizations.

The company has sustained continuous growth both financially (approximately $140 million in 2015 revenue) and in staffing (420 global staff, in addition to 750 Partner employees). It is recognized by industry analysts as a key player in video conferencing and managed services. In 2014 Frost & Sullivan ranked Yorktel third in market share for Hosted Managed Services in North America. Yorktel recently earned Commercial Integrator magazine's Integrator of the Year at the end of 2015.

Services

Yorktel serves government agencies and enterprise businesses in various sectors, helping them to incorporate video conferencing, streaming video, and networking into their day-to-day operations. In 2012, Yorktel was recognized by Systems Contractor News as the sixth largest systems integrator in the United States and Canada.

Yorktel Media Services provides a range of professional media services for the creation, production, and distribution of audio and video communications. Yorktel maintains over 15 top level certifications with for several companies. The company also offers the following services:

 Professional Services, including network and business use assessments, system design, integration approach recommendations, user training and adoption services
 Media Services, including video streaming, digital signing, video and event production. This division has won numerous awards, including an Emmy and multiple Telly awards. 
 Integration Services, including videoconferencing solutions, customized options, and unified communications. 
 Cloud Services, including protocol support, mobility and Bring Your Own Device (BYOD), public cloud and private cloud, economic value, personalized service, and cost structures tailored to business needs.  In 2014, Univago, a video platform-as-a-service, was launched.       
 Managed Services, including end-to-end video management, call launching and troubleshooting, on-site staffing & tech support, centralized scheduling, reporting, and incident management.  Yorktel has Video Network Operations Centers in New Jersey and in Basingstoke, UK.
 Telehealth, including telehealth carts, wall systems and mobile kits.

References

American companies established in 1985
Business services companies established in 1985
Companies based in Monmouth County, New Jersey
Eatontown, New Jersey